Carlos Adalberto Rolón Ibarra (born 30 June 1992) is a Paraguayan footballer who plays for Cerro Porteño and the Paraguay national football team.

He is the nephew of the well-known former football player and current Paraguayan coach Francisco Arce.

International career

Rolón played once for Paraguay national team. He played the World Cup qualifying match against Chile.

References

External links
 
 
 
 
 
 

1992 births
Living people
Paraguayan footballers
Paraguayan expatriate footballers
Paraguay international footballers
Association football defenders
Club Olimpia footballers
Sportivo Carapeguá footballers
Sportivo Luqueño players
Club Guaraní players
San Antonio Unido footballers
Cerro Porteño players
Segunda División Profesional de Chile players
Paraguayan expatriate sportspeople in Chile
Expatriate footballers in Chile